Ben Ross Schneider is an American political scientist and professor. He is currently the Ford International Professor of Political Science and director of the MIT Chile Program at Massachusetts Institute of Technology.

References

Year of birth missing (living people)
Living people
MIT School of Humanities, Arts, and Social Sciences faculty
American political scientists
Williams College alumni
Columbia University alumni
University of California, Berkeley alumni